Max Sutcliffe (30 July 1936 – 3 November 2003) was an  Australian rules footballer who played with Geelong in the Victorian Football League (VFL).

Notes

External links 

1936 births
2003 deaths
Australian rules footballers from Victoria (Australia)
Geelong Football Club players